Beat This! The Best of the Beat (released as Beat This! The Best of the English Beat in the US) is a greatest hits album by British ska/new wave band the Beat, released on 20 November 2000 in Europe by Go-Feet Records and on 11 September 2001 in the US by London-Sire Records.

As well as a different track order, the US version is different from the European release in that the track "Whine and Grine/Stand Down Margaret" (which was from the album Wh'appen) has been replaced with the dub version of "Stand Down Margaret" (which was originally released as a double A-side single with "Best Friend"). The US version is also an enhanced CD that includes exclusive online content and 5 music videos, which are "Doors of Your Heart", "Drowning", "Mirror in the Bathroom", "Save It for Later" and "Too Nice to Talk To".

Track listing

References 

The Beat (British band) albums
2000 compilation albums
Albums produced by Bob Sargeant